The Laurels is a greyhound racing competition held annually at Curraheen Park Greyhound Stadium located in Bishopstown, west of Cork, County Cork, Ireland.

It was hosted by the old Cork Greyhound Stadium from 1944 to 1999 but inevitably continued to be held at the new track after it opened.

It is a prestigious event targeted by many of Ireland's leading greyhounds and is an integral part of the Irish greyhound racing calendar.

Clonbrien Hero, trained by Graham Holland and owned by Ms. Kay Murphy of Athlacca, Co. Limerick set a new record for the final of the Laurels (at Curraheen Park) when he won by three lengths in a time of 28.00 on 22 July 2017.

Past winners

Venues & Distances
1944–1960 (Cork, Western Road, 500 yards)
1961–1999 (Cork, Western Road, 525 yards)
2000–present (Cork, Curraheen Park, 525 yards)

Sponsors 
1979–1981 (Cashmans)
1985–1986 (Joe Donnelly)
1987–1991 (Kantoher Co-op)
1992–1992 (Michael McCarthy)
1993–1994 (Michael Crowley)
1995–2003 (Co-op Superstores)
2004–2009 (Cashmans Bookmakers)
2010–2011 (Pat Hennerty Sales)
2012–2014 (Connolly's Red Mills)
2015–2019 (Irish Independent)

References

Greyhound racing competitions in Ireland
Sport in County Cork